Thomas Silberhorn (born 12 November 1968) is a German lawyer and politician of the Christian Social Union (CSU) who has been serving as a member of the Bundestag from the state of Bavaria since 2002.

Political career 
Silberhorn first became a member of the Bundestag in the 2002 German federal election. He has served on the Committee on European Affairs (2002-2013); the Subcommittee on Foreign Trade (2005-2009); and the Committee on Legal Affairs (2009-2013). In addition to his committee assignments, he is a member of the German-Japanese Parliamentary Friendship Group.

In the negotiations to form a coalition government of the Christian Democrats (CSU together with the CDU) and the FDP following the 2009 federal elections, Silberhorn was part of the CDU/CSU delegation in the working group on foreign affairs, defense, Europe and development policy, led by Franz Josef Jung and Werner Hoyer. In the negotiations to form a Grand Coalition of the Christian Democrats and the Social Democrats (SPD) following the 2013 federal elections, Silberhorn was part of the CDU/CSU delegation in the working group on bank regulation and the Eurozone, led by Herbert Reul and Martin Schulz.

In the third cabinet of Chancellor Angela Merkel from 2013 to 2017, Silberhorn served as Parliamentary State Secretary at the Federal Ministry of Economic Cooperation and Development under minister Gerd Müller.

In the negotiations to form another coalition government under Merkel's leadership following the 2017 federal elections, Silberhorn was part of the working group on foreign policy, led by Ursula von der Leyen, Gerd Müller and Sigmar Gabriel. 

From 2018 until 2021, Silberhorn served (alongside Peter Tauber) as one of two Parliamentary State Secretaries at the Federal Ministry of Defence under successive ministers Ursula von der Leyen (2018–2019) and Annegret Kramp-Karrenbauer (2019–2021).

In 2019, Silberhorn co-chaired the CSU’s convention in Munich, alongside Markus Blume and Florian Hahn.

Since the 2021 elections, Silberhorn has been serving as his parliamentary group’s spokesperson for Transatlantic relations.

Other activities 
 European Academy of Bavaria, Member of the Board of Trustees
 African Development Bank (AfDB), Ex-Officio Member of the Board of Governors (2013-2018)
 Deutsche Welle, Member of the Broadcasting Council (2013-2018)
 German Foundation for Peace Research (DSF), Member of the Board (2013-2018)
 German Institute for International and Security Affairs (SWP), Member of the Council (2013-2018)
 Federal Agency for Civic Education (BPB), Member of the Board of Trustees (2002-2005)

Political positions
In June 2017, Silberhorn voted against Germany's introduction of same-sex marriage.

References

External links 

  
 Bundestag biography 

1968 births
Living people
Members of the Bundestag for Bavaria
Members of the Bundestag 2021–2025
Members of the Bundestag 2017–2021
Members of the Bundestag 2013–2017
Members of the Bundestag 2009–2013
Members of the Bundestag 2005–2009
Members of the Bundestag 2002–2005
People from Bamberg (district)
Parliamentary State Secretaries of Germany
Members of the Bundestag for the Christian Social Union in Bavaria